Men's 10 metre platform event at the 2019 European Diving Championships was contested on 11 August.
Ukrainian Oleksii Sereda, aged 13 years and seven months at the time, won the gold medal becoming the youngest European Diving champion ever.

Results
19 athletes participated at the event; the best 12 from the preliminary round qualified for the final.

Preliminary round

Final

References

M